Topo is a fictional character that has appeared in American comic books published by DC Comics, notable as a loyal sidekick to Aquaman and often aids him and his allies in combat.

Publication history
Topo first appears in Adventure Comics vol 1 #229 and was created by Ramona Fradon.

As of current continuity there have been three different versions of the character which bear the name Topo. The first version is an intelligent octopus who is usually seen babysitting Aquababy to the best of his ability in the Pre-Crisis continuity. There is a second Topo who becomes an ally to the second Aquaman. He is an anthropomorphic squid-boy from Dyss, who helps Aquaman open portals throughout the ocean. All versions of the character has assisted Aquaman in his adventures and also appeared assisting other heroes as well.

Fictional character history
The original Topo was born in or near the undersea continent of Atlantis where he became a favored pet of Aquaman. The creature appears to be gifted with an exceptional intelligence compared to that of an average octopus, and possesses superior dexterity and problem solving skills as well. Topo once demonstrated his skill with a bow and arrow, and was even known to have developed a keen ear for music; supposedly he was able to play several musical instruments simultaneously.

The second version of Topo appears in Aquaman: Sword of Atlantis. This version is more humanoid in form, but still has many octopus-like abilities. His skin is grey with spots, and he has three fingers on each hand. His lower facial features, including mouth, are hidden behind six short tentacles. When Mera, Tempest and Cal Durham need to return to Sub Diego, he leads the group to hidden hatches that act as portals. Aquaman soon joins the group and Topo offers to lead them on a trip, but they are surprised by Baron Gargos who was at the behest of the Deep Church to kill them. After the fight with Gargos, they finally reach Sub Diego and notice that the city was dominated by Black Manta, who killed the local police and took Alonzo Malrey hostage to lure Orin. Realizing that it is not the original Aquaman, Black Manta orders his goons to shoot them all, Topo takes position and squirts ink as a distraction so they have a chance to escape.

In The New 52, Topo is reintroduced as a fearsome sea monster, a gigantic creature that is part octopus and part crab that only Aquaman can summon with a special conch. Aquaman summoned it to deal with the Scavenger, and uses his full telepathic power to unleash the creature on the Scavenger's fleet. However, this version of Topo is found to be too intelligent to be controlled by Aquaman's telepathy; while the creature managed to destroy the enemy submarines, the strain of mentally commanding Topo causes Aquaman to suffer from nosebleeding before passing out of consciousness.

Other versions
Topo appears in DC Super Friends, Tiny Titans and Scooby-Doo team up comics.

In other media
 Topo appears in the Young Justice episode "Downtime", voiced by James Arnold Taylor. He appears in semi-humanoid form as an Atlantean sorcery student. He returns in Young Justice: Phantoms.
 Topo appears in the film Aquaman, providing drum accompaniment during Arthur and Orm's Ring of Fire combat.

References

External links
 Alan Kistler's Profile On Aquaman

Comics characters introduced in 1956
Animal superheroes
Fictional octopuses
DC Comics sidekicks
DC Comics Atlanteans
DC Comics animals